Kim Jae-bum (김재범) (born January 25, 1985, in Gimcheon, Gyeongsangbuk-do) is a retired South Korean judoka. Despite being plagued with injuries throughout his career, Kim is known for dominating major competitions at the half-middleweight category (81kg)—particularly between his Olympic debut in 2008 and his 2012 Olympic finals rematch against Ole Bischof.

Kim has had several nicknames, including "Man of One Arm Wins" for his successes through injury, "Korean Tiger" for his aggressive play and iconic status in South Korean judo, and "Energizer Bunny" for his quick and relentless style of judo.

He was granted exemption from South Korea's mandatory military service in 2010, following his gold medal victory at the Guangzhou Asian Games.

Judo career
Kim won a gold medal in the -73 kg class at the 2004 World Junior Judo Championships in Budapest, Hungary.

At the 2005 Asian Judo Championships in Tashkent, he won a gold medal in the -73 kg class.

Kim was considered one of the Big Three Judokas of the -73 kg class in South Korea, along with Lee Won-hee and Wang Ki-chun. But in 2007, he moved up in weight to avoid the fierce competition, and won a gold medal in the -81 kg category at the 2008 Asian Judo Championships in Jeju.

At the 2008 Beijing Summer Olympics, Kim won the silver medal in the -81 kg class. In the preliminary rounds, he defeated 2006 European champion Serguei Shundikov of Belarus by points, and 2007 European champion Robert Krawczyk of Poland by ippon. Kim edged out 2008 European champion João Neto of Portugal by points in the quarterfinals. In the semifinal, Kim beat 2005 World Champion Guillaume Elmont of the Netherlands. Despite defeating all of the European champions from 2006-08 in the previous rounds, Kim lost in the final round to the 2005 European champion, Ole Bischof of Germany.

Kim won his first major gold medal at the 2010 World Judo Championships held in Tokyo, Japan. In the gold medal match, he defeated two-time Olympic medalist Leandro Guilheiro of Brazil by scoring a waza-ari with ouchi-gari in extra time.

Kim proceeded to become a two-time world champion at the 2011 World Judo Championships held in Paris, France. During the Round of 16, Kim avenged his 2008 Beijing Olympic Games finals loss to Ole Bischof. Kim went on to win gold by defeating Srdjan Mrvaljevic of Montenegro with a waza-ari by osaekomi.

In the 2012 London Summer Olympics, Kim won the gold medal in men's -81 kg division, defeating German rival, Ole Bischof.

He announced his retirement on 1 May 2016.

Achievements

Competitive record 

(as of 30 October 2015)

References

External links

 
 
 
 
 
 

Judoka at the 2008 Summer Olympics
Judoka at the 2012 Summer Olympics
Olympic judoka of South Korea
Olympic silver medalists for South Korea
Yong In University alumni
1985 births
Living people
Olympic medalists in judo
Asian Games medalists in judo
Olympic gold medalists for South Korea
Medalists at the 2012 Summer Olympics
Medalists at the 2008 Summer Olympics
Judoka at the 2010 Asian Games
Judoka at the 2014 Asian Games
South Korean male judoka
World judo champions
Asian Games gold medalists for South Korea
People from Gimcheon
Medalists at the 2010 Asian Games
Medalists at the 2014 Asian Games
Universiade medalists in judo
Universiade silver medalists for South Korea
Sportspeople from North Gyeongsang Province